Swanhild or Svanhild may refer to:

Historical

 Swanachild, Bavarian princess who became the wife of Charles Martel (c. 688–741)
 Swanhild, wife or concubine of King Harald Fairhair of Norway (c. 850–933) and mother of kings Bjørn Farmann of Vestfold and Olaf Haraldsson Geirstadalf of Vingulmark
 Swanehilde of Saxony (c. 945-1014), daughter of Hermann Billung, Margrave of Saxony, and wife of Thietmar, Margrave of Meissen and Eckard I, Margrave of Meissen
 Swanhild, abbess of Herford Abbey in Saxony (c. 1051–1076)
 Swanhilda of Eguisheim (c. 1025-1050), ancestor of many European royal families
 Swanhilde of Ungarnmark (d. 1120), Austrian royal consort
 Svanhild Sponberg (fl. 1965-1973), Norwegian handball player
 Svanhild of Essen (d. 1085), German abbess.

Arts and literature

 Svanhildr, daughter of Sigurd and Gudrun in northern European mythology
 Swanhild, a character in Henrik Ibsen's play Love's Comedy (1862)
 Swanilda/Swanhilde, the heroine of the ballet Coppélia (1870)
 Swanhild, a character in H. Rider Haggard's book Eric Brighteyes (1890)
 Swanhilde, a character in César Franck's opera Hulda (1894)